A research institute, research centre, research center or research organization, is an establishment founded for doing research. Research institutes may specialize in basic research or may be oriented to applied research. Although the term often implies natural science research, there are also many research institutes in the social science as well, especially for sociological and historical research purposes.

Famous research institutes 
In the early medieval period, several astronomical observatories were built in the Islamic world.  The first of these was the 9th-century Baghdad observatory built during the time of the Abbasid caliph al-Ma'mun, though the most famous were the 13th-century Maragheh observatory, and the 15th-century Ulugh Beg Observatory.

The Kerala School of Astronomy and Mathematics was a school of mathematics and astronomy founded by Madhava of Sangamagrama in Kerala, India. The school flourished between the 14th and 16th centuries and the original discoveries of the school seems to have ended with Narayana Bhattathiri (1559–1632). In attempting to solve astronomical problems, the Kerala school independently discovered a number of important mathematical concepts.

The earliest research institute in Europe was Tycho Brahe's Uraniborg complex on the island of Hven, a 16th-century astronomical laboratory set up to make highly accurate measurements of the stars.  In the United States there are numerous notable research institutes including Bell Labs,  Xerox Parc, The Scripps Research Institute, Beckman Institute, and SRI International. Hughes Aircraft used a research institute structure for its organizational model.

Thomas Edison, dubbed "The Wizard of Menlo Park", was one of the first inventors to apply the principles of mass production and large-scale teamwork to the process of invention in the late 1800s, and because of that, he is often credited with the creation of the first industrial research laboratory.

Research institutes in Europe 
From the throes of the Scientific Revolution came the 17th century scientific academy. In London, the Royal Society was founded in 1660, and in France Louis XIV founded the Académie royale des sciences in 1666 which came after private academic assemblies had been created earlier in the seventeenth century to foster research.

In the early 18th century, Peter the Great established an educational-research institute to be built in his newly created imperial capital, St Petersburg. His plan combined provisions for linguistic, philosophical and scientific instruction with a separate academy in which graduates could pursue further scientific research. It was the first institution of its kind in Europe to conduct scientific research within the structure of a university. The St Petersburg Academy was established by decree on 28 January 1724.

At the European level, there are now several government-funded institutions such as the European Space Agency (ESA), the nuclear research centre CERN, the European Southern Observatory ESO (Grenoble), the European Synchrotron Radiation Facility (ESRF) (Grenoble), the EUMETSAT facility, the Italian -European Sistema Trieste with, among others, the International Centre for Theoretical Physics and the research complex Elettra Sincrotrone Trieste, the biology project EMBL, and the fusion projects ITER and Wendelstein 7-X, which in addition to technical developments have a strong research focus.

Scientific research in twentieth century America 

Research institutes came to emerge at the beginning of the twentieth century. In 1900, at least in Europe and the United States, the scientific profession had only evolved so far as to include the theoretical implications of science and not its application. Research scientists had yet to establish a leadership in expertise. Outside scientific circles it was generally assumed that a person in an occupation related to the sciences carried out work which was necessarily "scientific" and that the skill of the scientist did not hold any more merit than the skill of a labourer. A philosophical position on science was not thought by all researchers to be intellectually superior to applied methods. However any research on scientific application was limited by comparison. A loose definition attributed all naturally occurring phenomena to "science". The growth of scientific study stimulated a desire to reinvigorate the scientific discipline by robust research in order to extract "pure" science from such broad categorisation.

1900–1939 
This began with research conducted autonomously away from public utility and governmental supervision. Enclaves for industrial investigations became established. These included the Rockefeller Institute, Carnegie Institution of Washington and the Institute for Advanced Study. Research was advanced in both theory and application. This was aided by substantial private donation.

1940 onward 
As of 2006, there were over 14,000 research centres in the United States.

The expansion of universities into the faculty of research fed into these developments as mass education produced mass scientific communities. A growing public consciousness of scientific research brought public perception to the fore in driving specific research developments. After the Second World War and the atom bomb specific research threads were followed: environmental pollution and national defence.

Notable research centres
Abdus Salam International Centre for Theoretical Physics
Ames Research Center
Bell Labs
Biological Research Centre
Center for Advanced Life Cycle Engineering
Centrum Wiskunde & Informatica
The Indian Council of Medical Research
Marine Sciences Research Center
Netherlands Organisation for Applied Scientific Research
Palo Alto Research Center
Pennington Biomedical Research Center
SRI International, or SRI. Also known as Stanford Research Institute prior to 1977.
Sri Lanka Institute of Nanotechnology
Tata Institute of Fundamental Research
Thomas J. Watson Research Center

See also
Think tank
European Survey Research Association
London Research Institute
Research funding
Contract research organization
Research Organization Registry

Footnotes 

 
Arab inventions